Ugu may refer to:

Telfairia occidentalis, a plant native to Africa

People with the surname
Catherine Ugwu (born 1964), British executive producer, creative director, and consultant for ceremonies and large-scale events
Chima Ugwu (born 1973), Nigerian shot-putter
Gozie Ugwu (born 1993), English footballer

See also
 Ugu (disambiguation)